Yom, or Pilapila, and formerly Kiliŋa or Kilir, is a Gur language of Benin. It is spoken in the town of Djougou and the surrounding area by the Yoa-Lokpa people. A very closely related dialect called taŋgələm is also spoken by the Taneka people.

Phonology
Where it differs from the IPA symbol, the conventional orthography is given below the phoneme.

Vowels

Consonants

Generally, /l/ is realised by [ɾ] in medial and final position. For some speakers, the two allophones are in free variation.

Grammar

Genders
Nouns are divided into genders or noun classes which can be distinguished by the pronoun used to refer to them and by their suffix, which generally bears some resemblance to the pronoun. If the noun is modified by adjectives, then the suffix appears on the adjectives and not on the noun. The table gives the singular and plural forms of the pronouns used to refer to a noun of each gender. There are also some nouns which have the pronoun də or bə without having a plural form.

Word order
Yom is predominantly an SVO language, although SOV word order is also possible. Genitives precede nouns and relative clauses follow. Adjectives, numerals and demonstratives follow the noun in that order and agree with it in number and gender. Many different constituents can preposed to the beginning of the sentence using a focus construction - for example:
, "I am eating my mango"
, "It's my mango that I'm eating"

References

Bibliography

 

Oti–Volta languages
Languages of Benin